Ewa Ambroziak (born 9 November 1950, Szczecin, Poland) is a Polish rower, Olympian (1976), gym teacher, and Master of sport who was awarded the PZTW medals. She graduated from the Pedagogical University of Kraków. She currently lives in the United States. She played in the sports club SKS . Her trainer was Ryszard Kędzierski.

Placings
 1972 - 6th place at the European Championships in Brandenburg (singles)
 1973 - 5th place at the European Championships in Moscow
 1973 - Polish champion (singles);
 1974 - 4th place at the World Championships in Lucerne (in representative talon double with Mieczysława Franczyk)
 1975 - 6th place at the World Championships in Nottingham (singles);
 1976 - 9th place during the Olympic Games in Montreal (singles) - fifth in the run (3: 58.09), fourth place Repechage (4: 16.74) and ninth place in the final B (4: 26.60).

See also
 Poland at the 1976 Summer Olympics

External links
 Ewa Ambroziak at the Polish Olympic Committee's website

Sources
 Lexicon of Polish Olympians (Bogdan Tuszyński, Henryk Kurzyński, 2007), the Fundacja Dobrej Książki, Warszaw 2007, 

1950 births
Living people
Sportspeople from Szczecin
Polish female rowers
Olympic rowers of Poland
Rowers at the 1976 Summer Olympics
Polish emigrants to the United States